Die antike Münze is an East German film. It was released in 1965.

External links
 

1965 films
1965 musical comedy films
German musical comedy films
East German films
Bulgarian musical films
1960s German-language films
Films shot in Bulgaria
Films about vacationing
1960s German films